Gregory is a census-designated place (CDP) in Rogers County, Oklahoma, United States. The population was 150 at the 2000 census.

Geography
The community is on US Route 412 approximately miles east of the Verdigris River and 3.5 miles northwest of Inola.

Demographics

As of the census of 2000, there were 150 people, 54 households, and 46 families residing in the CDP. The population density was 49.8 people per square mile (19.2/km2). There were 55 housing units at an average density of 18.2/sq mi (7.1/km2). The racial makeup of the CDP was 83.33% White, 10.00% Native American, 0.67% Asian, and 6.00% from two or more races. Hispanic or Latino of any race were 1.33% of the population.

There were 54 households, out of which 38.9% had children under the age of 18 living with them, 68.5% were married couples living together, 13.0% had a female householder with no husband present, and 13.0% were non-families. 9.3% of all households were made up of individuals, and 1.9% had someone living alone who was 65 years of age or older. The average household size was 2.78 and the average family size was 2.96.

In the CDP, the population was spread out, with 28.0% under the age of 18, 3.3% from 18 to 24, 32.0% from 25 to 44, 25.3% from 45 to 64, and 11.3% who were 65 years of age or older. The median age was 38 years. For every 100 females, there were 94.8 males. For every 100 females age 18 and over, there were 92.9 males.

The median income for a household in the CDP was $70,865, and the median income for a family was $71,154. Males had a median income of $36,731 versus $31,875 for females. The per capita income for the CDP was $22,116. There were none of the families and 2.0% of the population living below the poverty line, including no under eighteens and none of those over 64.

References

Census-designated places in Rogers County, Oklahoma
Census-designated places in Oklahoma